Mappusakshi is a 1972 Indian Malayalam film, directed by P. N. Menon and produced by United Producers. The film stars Madhu, Jayabharathi, Balan K Nair and Kuthiravattam Pappu in the lead roles. The film had musical score by M. S. Baburaj.

Cast
Madhu
Jayabharathi
Balan K. Nair
Kuthiravattam Pappu
Nellikode Bhaskaranf

Soundtrack
The music was composed by M. S. Baburaj and the lyrics were written by Sreekumaran Thampi and Mankombu Gopalakrishnan.

References

External links
 

1972 films
1970s Malayalam-language films
Films directed by P. N. Menon (director)